Philip Spies (born 21 May 1970) is a retired South African javelin thrower.
Primarily a provincial cricketer at school and South African Country District level, chose athletics over cricket. The arrival in  South Africa of American World Record Holder, Tom Petranoff (in 1989) was a big deciding factor for Spies with regards to choosing athletics over cricket. Petranoff became an integral part of Spies' athletics career and still  regards Petranoff as being one of the great javelin throwers of all time considering that Petranoff held two separate world records: 99.72m with the "Old" model and 85.38m (at the time a WR) with the "new" model. 
He became South African Schools champion at 17 years of age and achieved South African Schools Colors in 1988. 
Versatile sportsman who played on the SA Tennis Union circuit in 1990/ 1991 and reached a best golf handicap of 05 in 2000.

He won the bronze medal at the 1992 African Championships, the silver medal at the 1993 African Championships, finished eighth at the 1994 Commonwealth Games, and won the silver medal at the 1995 All-Africa Games. He also competed at the 1993 World Championships and the 1995 World Championships without reaching the final.

His personal best throw was 84.02 metres, achieved in April 1995 in Pietersburg.
Unofficially threw 89.10m in Harare, Zimbabwe in 1995.
Qualified Athletics South Africa Level 3 Javelin coach. Certified SAFA Level 1 soccer coach, certified SAMHA level 1 hockey coach. Qualified sports massage therapist.

Gym equipment consultant for Evolve Fitness SA together with Okkert Brits specializing in High Performance Centres across Southern Africa, Commercial Gyms, Schools, Olympic Weightlifting Facilities.

Upon retirement, he spent  15 years doing athletics commentary on IAAF International Competitions for SuperSport Television together with middle distance star Jean Verster.

References

1970 births
Living people
South African male javelin throwers
World Athletics Championships athletes for South Africa
Commonwealth Games competitors for South Africa
Athletes (track and field) at the 1994 Commonwealth Games
African Games silver medalists for South Africa
Athletes (track and field) at the 1995 All-Africa Games
African Games medalists in athletics (track and field)